The Men's 5000 m speed skating competition for the 2002 Winter Olympics was held in Salt Lake City, Utah, United States. Derek Parra and Jens Boden broke their personal bests by 15 seconds to win surprise medals, while Jochem Uytdehaage skated a new world record.

Records

Prior to this competition, the existing world and Olympic records were as follows.

The following new world and Olympic records were set during this competition.

Results

References

Men's speed skating at the 2002 Winter Olympics